WYE-687 is a drug which acts as an inhibitor of both subtypes of the mechanistic target of rapamycin (mTOR), mTORC1 and mTORC2. It is being researched for potential applications in the treatment of various forms of cancer.

References 

Enzyme inhibitors